Endothenia rhachistis is a moth of the family Tortricidae first described by Alexey Diakonoff in 1973. It is found in India and Sri Lanka.

Its larval food plant is Justicia gendarussa.

References

Moths of Asia
Moths described in 1973